Luis Antonio Dámaso de Alonso (December 11, 1905 – May 15, 1994), known professionally as Gilbert Roland, was a Mexican-born American film and television actor whose career spanned seven decades from the 1920s until the 1980s. He was twice nominated for the Golden Globe Award in 1952 and 1964 and inducted into the Hollywood Walk of Fame in 1960.

Early years

Roland was born in Ciudad Juárez, Chihuahua, Mexico, and originally intended to become a bullfighter like his father and his paternal grandfather. 

When Pancho Villa took control of their town, Roland and his family fled to the United States. He lived in Texas until at age 14 he hopped on a freight train and went to Hollywood. After arriving there, he found menial jobs and slept in a Catholic church. He often lost those jobs because he spent time working as an extra in films. He chose his screen name by combining the names of his favorite actors, John Gilbert and Ruth Roland. He was often cast in the stereotypical Latin lover role.

Career 
Roland's first film contract was with Paramount. His first major role was in the collegiate comedy The Plastic Age (1925) together with Clara Bow, to whom he became engaged. In 1926, he played Armand in Camille opposite Norma Talmadge, with whom he was romantically involved, and they starred together in several productions. With the advent of sound films, Roland frequently appeared in Spanish language adaptations of American films in romantic lead roles.

In 1933, Roland played a large supporting role in She Done Him Wrong as one of Mae West's character's lovers, along with rivals Cary Grant, Noah Beery Sr. and Owen Moore.

Roland served in the United States Army Air Corps during World War II.

Beginning in the 1940s, critics began to take notice of his acting, and he was praised for his supporting roles in John Huston's We Were Strangers (1949), The Bad and the Beautiful (1952), Thunder Bay (1953), and Cheyenne Autumn (1964). He also appeared in a series of films in the mid-1940s as the popular character "The Cisco Kid". He played Hugo, the agnostic (and fictional) friend of the three shepherd children in The Miracle of Our Lady of Fatima, based on the apparitions of Our Lady of Fatima in 1917. In 1953, Roland played Greek-American sponge diver Mike Petrakis in the epic Beneath the 12-Mile Reef.

He also portrayed Howard McMahon on Bewitched, acted on December Bride and Playhouse 90, and both wrote the script for and acted in an episode of Wagon Train. 

His last film appearance was in the 1982 western Barbarosa.

Personal life

Roland married actress Constance Bennett on April 20, 1941 in Yuma, Arizona. They were married until 1946 and had two daughters, Lorinda "Lynda" (b. 1938) and Christina "Gyl" (b. 1941). Bennett won custody of their daughters. He had appeared with Bennett in 1933 as Pepe in George Cukor's Our Betters, and in the same year, as the romantic lead in After Tonight, a World War I drama.

His second marriage to Guillermina Cantú in 1954 lasted until his death 40 years later.

Death
Gilbert Roland died of cancer in Beverly Hills, California, in 1994, aged 88. His body was cremated, and his ashes were scattered at sea.

Accolades
Roland was nominated twice for a Golden Globe Award, for his roles in The Bad and the Beautiful (1952) and Cheyenne Autumn (1964). For his contributions to the motion picture industry, Gilbert Roland has a star on the Hollywood Walk of Fame at 6730 Hollywood Boulevard.

Archives
The moving-image collection of Gilbert Roland is held at the Academy Film Archive. Home movies make up the bulk of the collection. The film material at the Academy Film Archive is complemented by material in the Gilbert Roland papers at the Academy's Margaret Herrick Library.

In 1975, El Paso, Texas, held Gilbert Roland Days. Among the recognition given the actor was creation of The Gilbert Roland Newspaper Carrier Scholarships Fund by the Newspaper Printing Corporation.

Filmography

Cinema 

The Hunchback of Notre Dame (1923) as Extra (uncredited)
The Lost World (1925) as Extra (uncredited)
The Spaniard (1925) as Matador (uncredited)
The Lady Who Lied (1925)
The Lawful Cheater (1925) (uncredited)
The Midshipman (1925) (uncredited)
The Plastic Age (1925) as Carl Peters
The Campus Flirt (1926) as Graham Stearns
The Blonde Saint (1926) as Annibale
Camille (1926) as Armand Duval
Rose of the Golden West (1927) as Juan
The Love Mart (1927) as Victor Jallot
The Dove (1927) as Johnny Powell
The Woman Disputed (1928) as Paul Hartman
New York Nights (1929) as Fred Deverne
Men of the North (1930) (Spanish and French version also filmed) as Louis La Bey aka Monsieur Le Fox
Resurrección (1931) (Spanish version of Resurrection) as Prince Dmitri Nekhludov 
The Passionate Plumber (1932) as Tony Lagorce
Hombres de mi vida (1932) (Spanish version of Men in Her Life) as Jaime Gilman
The Woman in Room 13 (1932) as Victor Legrand
Life Begins  (1932) as Tony, Rita's Husband (uncredited)
No Living Witness (1932) as Jerry Bennett
A Parisian Romance (1932) as Victor
Call Her Savage (1932) as Moonglow
She Done Him Wrong (1933) as Serge Stanieff
Our Betters (1933) as Pepi D'Costa
The Romantic Widow (1933) as Luis Felipe de Córdoba aka Prudencio González
Tarnished Youth (1933) (UK version of Gigolettes of Paris) as Antoine 'Tony' Ferrand
After Tonight (1933) as Captain Rudolph "Rudy" Ritter
Yo, tú y ella (1933) as Gabriel Villalba
Elinor Norton (1934) as Rene Alba
Mystery Woman (1935) as Juan Santanda
Juliet Buys a Baby (1935) as Jack Aranda
Ladies Love Danger (1935) as Ricardo Souchet aka Alonzo
Midnight Taxi (1937) as Flash Dillon
The Last Train from Madrid (1937) as Eduardo de Soto
Thunder Trail (1937) as Dick Ames aka Arizona Lopez
La vida bohemia (1938) as Rodolfo
Gateway (1938) as Tony Cadona
Juarez (1939) as Colonel Miguel Lopez
Isle of Destiny (1940) as Oliver Barton
Gambling on the High Seas (1940) as Greg Morella
The Sea Hawk (1940) as Capt. Lopez
Rangers of Fortune (1940) as Antonio Hernandez Sierra
Angels with Broken Wings (1941) as Don Pablo Vincente
My Life with Caroline (1941) as Paco Del Valle
Enemy Agents Meet Ellery Queen (1942) as Paul Gillette
Isle of Missing Men (1942) as Thomas 'Dan' Bentley aka Curtis
The Desert Hawk (1944) as Kasim, The Desert Hawk / Hassan, The Evil Twin Brother
Captain Kidd (1945) as Jose Lorenzo
The Gay Cavalier (1946) as The Cisco Kid
South of Monterey (1946) as The Cisco Kid
Beauty and the Bandit (1946) as The Cisco Kid
Riding the California Trail (1947) as The Cisco Kid posing as Don Luis Salazar
The Other Love (1947) as Croupier
High Conquest (1947) as Hugo Lanier
Robin Hood of Monterey (1947) as The Cisco Kid
Pirates of Monterey (1947) as Major de Rojas
 King of the Bandits (1947) as the Cisco Kid aka Ramon Mojica
The Dude Goes West (1948) as Pecos Kid
The Rebellion of the Ghosts (1949) as Arturo del Rosal
We Were Strangers (1949) as Guillermo Montilla
Malaya (1949) as Romano
The Torch (1950) as Father Sierra
Crisis (1950) as Roland Gonzales
The Furies (1950) as Juan Herrera
Bullfighter and the Lady (1951) as Manolo Estrada
The Mark of the Renegade (1951) as Don Pedro Garcia
Ten Tall Men (1951) as Corporal Luis Delgado
My Six Convicts (1952) as Punch Pinero
Glory Alley (1952) as Peppi Donnato
The Miracle of Our Lady of Fatima (1952) as Hugo da Silva
Apache War Smoke (1952) as Peso Herrera
The Bad and the Beautiful (1952) as Victor 'Gaucho' Ribero
Thunder Bay (1953) as Teche Bossier
The Diamond Queen (1953) as Baron Paul de Cabannes
Beneath the 12-Mile Reef (1953) as Mike Petrakis
The French Line (1953) as Pierre DuQuesne
The Racers (1955) as Dell'Oro
Underwater! (1955) as Dominic Quesada
That Lady (1955) as Antonio Perez
The Treasure of Pancho Villa (1955) as Colonel Juan Castro
Bandido (1956) as Colonel José Escobar
Around the World in 80 Days (1956) as Achmed Abdullah
Three Violent People (1956) as Innocencio Ortega
The Midnight Story (1957) as Sylvio Malatesta
The Last of the Fast Guns (1958) as Miles Lang
The Wild and the Innocent (1959) as Paul
The Big Circus (1959) as Zach Colino
Catch Me If You Can (1959) (unreleased)
Guns of the Timberland (1960) as Monty Walker
Samar (1962) as Col. Juan Sebastian Salazar
Cheyenne Autumn (1964) as Dull Knife
The Reward (1965) as Capt. Carbajal
The Poppy Is Also a Flower (1966) as Serge Marko
Any Gun Can Play (1967) as Monetero
The Ruthless Four (1968) as Mason
Between God, the Devil and a Winchester (1968) as Horace
Johnny Hamlet (1968) as Juan Chasquisdo
Sartana Does Not Forgive (1968) as Kirchner
The Christian Licorice Store (1971) as Jonathan 'JC' Carruthers
Running Wild (1973) as Chief Tomacito
Treasure of Tayopa (1974) as Himself - Host
The Pacific Connection (1974) as Alan
Islands in the Stream (1977) as Captain Ralph
The Black Pearl  (1977)
Caboblanco (1980) as Dr. Rudolfo Ramirez
Barbarosa (1982) as Don Braulio (final film role)

Television 
Zorro, episodes "El Bandido" and "Adios El Cuchillo" (1960) as El Cuchillo / The Knife
Gunsmoke, episode "Extradition" (1963) as Lt. Julio Chavez
Death Valley Days, episode "A Kingdom for a Horse" (1963) as Emperor Dom Pedro
The Fugitive, episode "Somebody to Remember" (1964) as Gus Priamos; 
Combat!, episode "The Convict" (1965) as Boulanger
Bonanza, episode "The Lonely Runner" (1965) as Jim Acton
The Fugitive, episode "The Savage Street" (1967) as Jose Anza.
The High Chaparral, episode "The New Lion of Sonora" (1971) as Don Domingo Montoya
Night Gallery, segment "The Waiting Room" (1972) as The Bartender 
Incident on a Dark Street (1973, TV Movie) as Dominic Leopold
Kung Fu (1972 TV series), episode "The Chalice" (1973)
Barnaby Jones, episode "Rendezvous with Terror" (1974)
The Mark of Zorro (1974, TV Movie) as Don Alejandro Vega
The Sacketts (1979, TV Movie) as Don Luis
Hart to Hart, episode "The Raid" (1980) as Jorge

Short subjects 
La Fiesta de Santa Barbara (1935)
Screen Snapshots Series 15, No. 8 (1936)
Picture People No. 2: Hollywood Sports (1941)
Wings Up (1943)

References

Monush, Barry. The Encyclopedia of Film Actors From The Silent Era to 1965. New York: Applause Theatre & Cinema Books, 2003.

External links

Original letter from Greta Garbo to Gilbert Roland (1943)
Photographs and literature

1905 births
1994 deaths
American male film actors
American male silent film actors
Hispanic and Latino American male actors
Mexican emigrants to the United States
People from Ciudad Juárez
People from Los Angeles
Deaths from cancer in California
Mexican male film actors
American male actors of Mexican descent
20th-century American male actors
Male Western (genre) film actors